Mold F.C. was a Welsh association football club. Formed in 1886 it participated in both the Welsh Cup (semifinalists in 1887–88, 1890–91 and 1924–25) and the English FA Cup (1924–25).

References

Defunct football clubs in Wales
Welsh National League (North) clubs